Enderlein is a surname. Notable people with the surname include:

 Günther Enderlein (1872–1968), German entomologist
 Henrik Enderlein (1974–2021), German economist and political scientist
 Ortrun Enderlein (born 1943), German luger